The Alyth railway station served the town of Alyth in the Scottish county of Perth and Kinross. The station was the terminus of a branch line from Alyth Junction on the Scottish Midland Junction Railway that  ran between Perth and Arbroath.

History
Opened by the Alyth Railway on 12 August 1861 and absorbed into the Caledonian Railway, it became part of the London, Midland and Scottish Railway during the grouping of 1923. Passing on to the Scottish Region of British Railways upon nationalisation in 1948, it was then closed by British Railways on 2 July 1951.

References

Notes

Sources
 
 
 
 Station on navigable O.S. map

External links
RAILSCOT on Alyth Railway 

Disused railway stations in Perth and Kinross
Railway stations in Great Britain opened in 1861
Railway stations in Great Britain closed in 1951
Former Caledonian Railway stations
1861 establishments in Scotland
1951 disestablishments in Scotland